Locomotives named Ajax have included:

L&MR 29 Ajax (1832), an 0-2-2
L&SR Ajax (1838), an 0-4-2
GWR Ajax (1838), a broad gauge Premier class 0-6-0; withdrawn 1871.
 KFNB Ajax (Jones, Turner and Evans, 1841), one of a pair of 0-4-2 locomotive built for the Emperor Ferdinand Northern Railway, believed to be the oldest preserved steam locomotive on the European mainland; displayed in the Technisches Museum Wien
L&SWR 41 Ajax (Jones, Turner & Evans, 1841) a Hercules I class 0-4-2 goods locomotive
MS&LR 24 Ajax (1846), a 2-2-2 locomotive
ELR 17 (1847), a Pegasus class
SSR 21 (1855)
L&SWR 41 Ajax (Nine Elms, 1855) a Hercules II class 2-4-0, withdrawn 1883
LC&DR Ajax (1860) a Dido class 0-6-0, later numbered 144
SDR Ajax, (Slaughter, Grüning & Co. 395 of 1860) one of the eight South Devon Railway Dido class broad gauge 0-6-0ST locomotives, later GWR 2149; withdrawn 1884.
Logan and Hemingway (civil engineering contractors) 5 Ajax (1864), later sold to the Manchester, Sheffield and Lincolnshire Railway
L&SWR 41 Ajax (Nine Elms 124 of 1874)  a Vesuvius II class 2-4-0 passenger locomotive
L&NWR 509 (Crewe Works 2799 of 1885), a Dreadnought class 2-2-2-0 passenger locomotive scrapped in 1904.
Woolwich Arsenal Ajax, an 18-inch gauge 0-4-0T
L&NWR 639 Ajax (Crewe Works 4445 of 1904), an LNWR Precursor class 4-4-0, later LMS 5190; withdrawn 1928 
Ajax (Andrew Barclay Sons & Co. 1605 of 1918), an 0-6-T preserved on the Isle of Wight Steam Railway as their No. 38
LMSR 6139 Ajax (North British Locomotive Co. 23634 of 1927), an LMS Royal Scot Class 4-6-0 express locomotive, Renamed The Welch Regiment in 1936, rebuilt in 1946 and withdrawn 1962
LMS 5689 Ajax (Crewe Works 287 [second series] of 1936), an LMS Jubilee Class express locomotive, withdrawn 1964 
Chatham Dockyard Trust Ajax (Robert Stephenson & Hawthorns 7042 of 1941), built for Chatham Dockyard. Preserved.
BR D446, later 50046 (English Electric 3816 and Vulcan Foundry D1187 of 1968), one of the fifty class 50s, all of which were named after warships

References

Citations

Cited sources